António Filipe may refer to:
António Filipe Camarão (1580–1648), Brazilian soldier
António Filipe (politician) (born 1963), Portuguese politician
António Filipe de Sousa Gouveia (born 1973), Portuguese former footballer who played as a midfielder
António Filipe (footballer, born 1985), Portuguese footballer who plays as a goalkeeper